Gjon Muharremaj (born 29 June 1998 in Saanen, Switzerland), known professionally as Gjon's Tears, is a Swiss singer and songwriter. He was scheduled to represent Switzerland in the Eurovision Song Contest 2020 with the song "Répondez-moi" prior to the event's cancellation. He was internally selected again as the country's representative for the 2021 contest with "Tout l'univers". He finished in third place with 432 points, the best placing for Switzerland since 1993.

Life and career 
Muharremaj was born in Saanen, Bern, Switzerland to a Kosovo Albanian father from Gjinoc, part of Suharekë municipality in Kosovo, and an Albanian mother from Tirana, Albania. His father, Hysni, is a crane operator and mason. His mother, Elda, has worked in the Cailler chocolate factory after the family moved to Broc in 2000. 

He grew up in Broc, where he played football and did karate. When he was 7 years old, he discovered his passion for music during music class. Two years later he acquired his stage name after moving his grandfather to tears when he performed Elvis Presley's "Can't Help Falling in Love". In 2011, at the age of 12, he competed in the first season of the talent show Albanians Got Talent, placing third in the final. One year later, he reached the semi-final of Die grössten Schweizer Talente, the Swiss version of Got Talent.

In 2018, he found his band Gjon’s Tears and the Weeping Willows, consisting of himself and Gaëtan Guélat (drummer), Martino Lepori (guitarist), Pascal Stoll (guitarist) and Samuel Riedo (bassist).

In 2019, he auditioned for the eighth season of the French singing competition The Voice:  and reached the semi-finals with Team Mika.

In the summer of 2019, the band performs at different Swiss festivals following Gjon’s The Voice participation, including the Montreux Jazz Festival, Les Georges, and Les Francomanias.

In March 2020, Gjon's Tears was announced by the Swiss national broadcaster, Swiss Broadcasting Corporation (SRG SSR), as the country's representative at the Eurovision Song Contest 2020 with the song "Répondez-moi". However, following the contest's cancellation due to the COVID-19 pandemic in Europe, the broadcaster eventually announced that he would represent the country at the Eurovision Song Contest 2021 with a new song. His 2021 entry, "Tout l'univers" was released on 10 March 2021. "Tout l'univers" placed first in its semi-final. In the final, it won the jury vote but came sixth in the televote. As a result, Switzerland was placed third overall, behind France and eventual winner Italy. Gjon's Tears, along with the song's producers, won the Composer Award in the 2021 edition of the Marcel Bezençon Awards, voted on by a panel of participating composers in the 2021 contest. In 2021, he gave an interview for Vanity Teen magazine, talking about his success, the origin of his stage name and his result in the Eurovision Song Contest.

In late 2021, he participated in The Voice All Stars France, but was eliminated in the semi-final.

In November 2021, Gjon was announced as Best Swiss Act at the MTV Europe Music Awards in Budapest. With his victory, he breaks the streak (2) of Loredana Zefi. In March 2022, Gjon moved from Switzerland to Paris. 

He released his sixth single, "Pure" on 28 October 2022, with the music video being released the following month. This music video includes, besides 11 art inspired scenes, a short appearance of Geraldine Chaplin.

His debut album The Game is expected to be released on 28 April 2023.

Discography

Studio albums

Singles

As lead artist

As featured artist

Awards and nominations

References 

1998 births
21st-century Swiss singers
Eurovision Song Contest entrants for Switzerland
Eurovision Song Contest entrants of 2020
Eurovision Song Contest entrants of 2021
Living people
People from Gruyère District
Swiss people of Albanian descent
Swiss people of Kosovan descent
Swiss expatriates in France
Got Talent contestants
The Voice (franchise) contestants
MTV Europe Music Award winners